Nationality words link to articles with information on the nation's poetry or literature (for instance, Irish or France).

Events

Works published

1310:
The chansonnier known as "troubadour MS P" was compiled in Lombardy. Now in the Biblioteca Laurenziana, Florence, XLI.42.

1312:
Jacques de Longuyon writes the chanson de geste Les Voeux du paon ("The Vows of the Peacock") for Theobald (bishop of Liège).

Births
Death years link to the corresponding "[year] in poetry" article. There are conflicting or unreliable sources for the birth years of many people born in this period; where sources conflict, the poet is listed again and the conflict is noted:

1311:
 Munenaga (died 1385), imperial prince and a poet of the Nijō poetic school of Nanboku-chō period

1315:
 Hafez (died 1390), Persian lyric poet

Deaths
Birth years link to the corresponding "[year] in poetry" article:

1310:
 Henry Bate of Malines (born 1246), Flemish philosopher, theologian, astronomer, astrologer, poet and musician

1312:
 Cecco Angiolieri (born 1260), Italian
 Sultan Walad (born unknown), Persian poet and Sufi, and a founder of the Mevlevi Order 

1313:
 Yao Sui (born 1238), writer of Chinese Sanqu poetry and an official

1314:
 Homam-e Tabrizi (born 1238), Persian poet of the Ilkhanid era

1315:
 Ramon Llull (born 1232), Catalan poet and philosopher
 Lu Zhi (born 1243), Chinese writer and poet of the Yuan dynasty

1316
 Guillaume Guiart, French chronicler and poet

1319:
 Guan Daosheng (born 1262), Chinese poet and painter during the Yuan dynasty

See also

 Poetry
 14th century in poetry
 14th century in literature
 List of years in poetry
 Grands Rhétoriqueurs
 French Renaissance literature
 Renaissance literature
 Spanish Renaissance literature

Other events:
 Other events of the 14th century
 Other events of the 15th century

15th century:
 15th century in poetry
 15th century in literature

Notes

14th-century poetry
Poetry